TBS, formerly branded as TBS veryfunny, is the Latin American version of the U.S. cable television channel TBS.

The channel, launched on October 1, 2011, has a lineup of comedy films and series.

Programming

Current programming
Impractical Jokers
Wrecked
Falling Skies
Those Who Can't
I'm Sorry

Former programming
Are We There Yet?
Hot in Cleveland
Web Therapy
Anger Management
Angie Tribeca
Bent
Glenn Martin, DDS
Elmiro Miranda Show (original production, seen only in Brazil)
Cupido (original production)
Psiconautas (original production)
Brooklyn Nine-Nine
The Millers
The Mindy Project
The Office (U.K.)
The Office (U.S.)
My Name is Earl
The New Adventures of Old Christine
Everybody Hates Chris
The King of Queens
Everybody Loves Raymond
Becker
Wings
CQC: Custe o Que Custar (seen only in Brazil)
Os Anjos do Sexo (seen only in Brazil)
É Tudo Improviso (seen only in Brazil)
 Junkyard Dogs (tv series 2024) (perros chatarreros)
Sex and the City
30 Rock
The Nanny
Married... with Children
Lost
Wedding Band
The Last O.G. (currently seen on Warner Channel)
Search Party (currently seen on Warner Channel)
The Detour

Adult Swim block
 Aqua Teen Hunger Force 
 Robot Chicken 
 Sealab 2021
 Squidbillies
 The Brak Show
 Rick and Morty 
 Harvey Birdman, Attorney at Law
 Mr. Pickles
 Space Ghost Coast to Coast
 Stroker and Hoop
  12 oz. Mouse 
 Hot Streets

External links
TBS website for Spanish-speaking countries
TBS website for Brazil

Warner Bros. Discovery Americas